On Stage Vol. 1 is a live album by saxophonist Clifford Jordan which was recorded in Holland in 1975 and first released on the SteepleChase label in 1977.

Reception

In his review on Allmusic, Scott Yanow says that "the musicians sound inspired by each other's presence, and there are many strong solos from Jordan and Walton. Well worth investigating".

Track listing 
All compositions by Clifford Jordan except as indicated
 "Pinocchio" (Wayne Shorter) - 7:27   
 "That Old Devil Moon" (Yip Harburg, Burton Lane) - 13:10   
 "The Maestro" (Cedar Walton) - 6:08   
 "The Highest Mountain" - 14:08

Personnel 
Clifford Jordan - tenor saxophone
Cedar Walton - piano
Sam Jones - bass
Billy Higgins - drums

References 

Clifford Jordan live albums
1977 live albums
SteepleChase Records live albums